The following lists events that happened during 1870 in Liberia.

Incumbents
President: James Spriggs Payne (until January 3), Edward James Roye (starting January 3)
Vice President: Joseph Gibson (until January 3), James Skivring Smith (starting January 3)
Chief Justice: C. L. Parsons

Events

May
 May 3 – Liberian constitutional referendum, 1870

Births
 January 30 – Theophilus Momolu Gardiner, Liberian religious leader, in Dearlah, Grand Cape Mount County, (d. 1941)
 October 29 – Samuel Alfred Ross, Vice President of Liberia (1920–1924), in Greenville (d. 1929)

References

 
Years of the 19th century in Liberia
Liberia
Liberia